Bonebakker is the name of a Dutch patrician family.

History 
The ancestor Reynier Dircss Boonebacker originally came from the Duchy of Jülich. He settled as a Draper in Utrecht. Members of the family included, for example, the cashier and/or proprietor of the loan bank in Wijk bij Duurstede, Culemborg, Bergen op Zoom, Buren and Tiel. Adrianus Bonebakker decided to settle in Amsterdam in 1792. He partnered up with Diederik Lodewijk Bennewitz to take over a well-known Dutch gold, silver and jewellery shop in 1802, the Peirolet brothers’ business. Initially under the brothers Peirolet, Bennewitz & Bonebakker name and later as Bennewitz & Bonebakker. The partners decided to part company for business reasons in 1821 and Adrianus and his son Jacques Antoine Bonebakker continued the company under the As Bonebakker & Zoon name.

The company produced the keys to the City of Amsterdam for King Lodewijk Napoleon in 1806 and a second set of keys to the City of Amsterdam was handed to Emperor Napoleon Bonaparte during his visit to Amsterdam in 1811. A 491-piece dinner service was produced for Prince Willem II, as well as the royal crown for Willem II in 1840. The maker of this crown, which to this day is still being used during coronation ceremonies, was Theodorus Gerardus Bentvelt.

Notable members 

Adrianus Bonebakker (1767-1842), founder of the Amsterdam gold and silversmith company
 Jacques Antoine Bonebakker (1798-1868), an As Bonebakker & Zoon partner
 Willem Christiaan Bonebakker (1866-1951), banker
 Jan Willem Bonebakker (1893-1989), engineer and Professor in Marine Engineering
 Adrianus Bonebakker (1895-1975), doctor
 Claire Bonebakker (1904-1979), a Dutch painter

References 

Dutch patrician families